Arthur Jones  (1940 – 1998)   was an American Free Jazz alto saxophonist known for his highly  energetic but warm tones.

Jones was born in Cleveland, USA, and played for several years in a Rock and Roll band. After discovering  music by Ornette Coleman and  Eric Dolphy, he started appearing  on  the New York scene, playing  in Frank Wright's group where he took part in  the recording  of the  Your Prayer (1967) album. He then also  worked with Jacques Coursil. He also  made numerous other recordings for  BYG Actuel, with Coursil, Archie Shepp, Sunny Murray or Burton Greene. He died in New York City, USA.

Discography

1969: Africanasia (BYG Actuel) with Joseph Jarman, Roscoe Mitchell, Clifford Thornton, Malachi Favors, et al. (recorded during August 1969)
1971: Scorpio (BYG Actuel) with bassist Beb Guérin and drummer Claude Delcloo  (recorded during August 1969)

As sideman
1967: Your Prayer - Frank Wright (ESP-Disk)
1969: Echo - Dave Burrell (BYG Actuel)
1969: Homage to Africa - Sunny Murray (BYG Actuel)
1969: Ketchaoua - Clifford Thornton (BYG Actuel)
1969: Sunshine - Sunny Murray (BYG Actuel)
1969: Way Ahead - Jacques Coursil (BYG Actuel)
1969: Yasmina, a Black Woman - Archie Shepp (BYG Actuel)
1969: Aquariana - Burton Greene (BYG Actuel)
1971: Black Suite - Jacques Coursil (BYG Actuel)
1975: Bijou - Archie Shepp (Musica Records)
2005: The Complete ESP-Disk Recordings - Frank Wright (ESP-Disk)

References

American jazz alto saxophonists
American male saxophonists
BYG Actuel artists
Free jazz saxophonists
1998 deaths
1940 births
20th-century American saxophonists
20th-century American male musicians
American male jazz musicians